Mankapur is a town and a nagar panchayat in Gonda district in the Indian state of Uttar Pradesh. It is a constituency of Uttar Pradesh Legislative Assembly currently headed by BJP. It borders Gonda to the West, Rehra to the North, Maskanawa to the East and Nawabganj to the South.

Demographics
According to the 2001 India census, Mankapur had a population of 8,865. Males constituted 54 percent of the population and females 46 percent. The city had an average literacy rate of 77 percent, which exceeded the national average of 67.5 percent. Male literacy was higher than female literacy, with 86 percent to 75 percent. 13 percent of the population was revealed to be under 6 years of age.

Languages 
Languages spoken in Mankapur include Awadhi, a dialect of Hindi continuum spoken by over 38 million people, mainly in the Awadh region.

History
Mankapur mandal was a Taluqedari (estate) formed when Raja Dutt Singh of Gonda, of the Bisen Rajput dynasty, seized the Bandhalgoti raj of Mankapur and gave it to his younger infant son, Kunwar Ajmat Singh around 1681, making him the first ruler of the state. The state had 189 villages under it and during the British Raj, it was a pargana in Utraula tehsil. It became a separate tehsil in 1987, later in 1997 when the Gonda district was divided to create Balrampur district, it remained with its mm oformer district.

The last ruler of this Taluqedari before independence was Raghavendra Pratap Singh, who was a Congress politician (1933–1955) and who served in the UP assembly continuously since 1937.

Transport
Mankapur Junction railway station is the nearest railway station and the nearest airport is Chaudhary Charan Singh Airport (Amausi) near state capital Lucknow. Mankapur is well connected by roadways to Gonda, Faizabad and state capital of Lucknow.

Economy
Mankapur has one of the country's six largest manufacturing plants of Indian Telephone Industries (ITI). Along with that major occupation of public is Agriculture. With good connectivity with other districts, Mankapur serves as a luring place for further industrial growth.

Geography
The famous Manwar River passes through Mankapur. Unfortunately, the river is dying a slow death, so a cleaning program was initiated by Yogi Adityanath in order to rejuvenate the flow of river. It is believed that Lord Dasrath performed Yagya at Makhoda Dham resulting in birth of Lord Rama.

References

External links
 Royal Family of Mankapur

Cities and towns in Gonda district